Tokuzō Fukuda (福田 徳三 Fukuda Tokuzō; born February 12, 1874; died May 8, 1930) was a pioneer of modern Japanese economics.

Fukuda introduced economic theory and economic history for the Social Policy School and the Younger Historical school of economics.

He graduated from the Tokyo Higher School of Commerce (today's Hitotsubashi University). After he was appointed lecturer of his alma mater, he studied in Germany, under Karl Bücher among others in the field, and he earned his doctorate from Munich University. His thesis dealt with the social and economic development in Japan (original title: Die gesellschaftliche und wirtschaftliche Entwicklung in Japan) and was supervised by Lujo Brentano.

After returning to Japan, he became professor of his alma mater and later at Keiō University.

During the years known as the period of "Taishō Democracy", he joined with others to establish Reimeikai, which was a society "to propagate ideas of democracy among the people." This group was formed in order to sponsor public lectures.

After World War I, he defended democracy, advanced a critique of Marxian theory, and emphasized the solution of social and labour problems by government intervention rather than revolution. He is also considered a pioneer of the contemporary welfare state. As an advisor to the Ministry of Home Affairs, he also worked out policy drafts. He is closely related to the Japanese liberal movement and is considered a social-liberal or social-democrat.

Notes

References
 Marshall, Byron K. (1992). Academic Freedom and the Japanese Imperial University, 1868-1939. Berkeley: University of California Press.;  OCLC 25130703
 Nussbaum, Louis-Frédéric and Käthe Roth. (2005).  Japan encyclopedia. Cambridge: Harvard University Press. ;  OCLC 58053128

Japanese economists
1874 births
1930 deaths
Hitotsubashi University alumni
Japanese social liberals
Japanese social democrats
Liberalism in Japan
Recipients of the Legion of Honour